Nassib and its variant Nasib are both a given name and surname. Notable people with the name include:

Given name
 Nasib Arida (1887–1946), Syrian poet and writer
 Nasibi Tahir Babai (d.1835), Albanian Bektashi saint
 Nasib al-Bakri, Syrian nationalist and statesman
 Nasib al-Bitar (1890–1948), Palestinian jurist
 Nassib Lahoud (1944–2012), Lebanese-Christian political figure
 Nasib Al Matni (1910–1958), Lebanese journalist and publisher
 Nassib Nassar, American computer scientist and classical pianist
 Nasib Yusifbeyli (1881–1920), Azerbaijani publicist

Surname
Carl Nassib (born 1993), American football player
Ryan Nassib (born 1990), American football player

See also
Naseeb (disambiguation), includes people with similar given name and surname